French Gulch is a census-designated place (CDP) in Shasta County, California, United States. Its population is 373 as of the 2020 census, up from 346 from the 2010 census.

History
French Gulch was founded by French miners in 1849 and became one of California's major gold producing areas. The town became a major supply place when it became the terminus of the western branch of the California Trail. French Gulch was registered as a California Historical Landmark in 1935.

French Gulch was an important, early, hard rock mining district. The Washington vein system was discovered in 1852, and was worked periodically through about 1914. It is estimated to have produced about 100,000 ounces of gold. The Niagara Mine is estimated to have produced about 50,000 ounces from its past operations. As of 2008, limited production has resumed from the Washington and Niagara mines.

On August 14, 2004, the entire town of French Gulch was evacuated due to a forest fire which roared out of control through much of Shasta County. The fire burned 13,005 acres and destroyed 26 residences, 1 commercial building, and 76 outbuildings. The evacuation lasted 3 days, allowing residents to return home on August 17, 2004. A total of 1,345 fire personnel helped get the blaze under control. The cause was never determined.

On July 22, 2018, French Gulch was evacuated due to the Carr Fire, which was started by a motor vehicle malfunction. As of August 2, air and ground crews continued to work in the area to protect the town from the fire, and many of the buildings, including the historic hotel, were still standing. On August 8, the evacuation order for French Gulch and surrounding areas was lifted, and residents were allowed to return to their homes.

Geography
French Gulch is located at  (40.705313, -122.635174). Lying a few miles northwest of Whiskeytown Lake, the hamlet lies along Trinity Mountain Road going north from California State Route 299 with the town center about 3 miles north of 299, and about 19 highway-miles from downtown Redding.

Demographics

2010
At the 2010 census French Gulch had a population of 346. The racial makeup of French Gulch was 296 (85.5%) White, 3 (0.9%) African American, 15 (4.3%) Native American, 3 (0.9%) Asian, 1 (0.3%) Pacific Islander, 8 (2.3%) from other races, and 20 (5.8%) from two or more races. Hispanic or Latino of any race were 17 people (4.9%).

The whole population lived in households, no one lived in non-institutionalized group quarters and no one was institutionalized.

There were 147 households, 32 (21.8%) had children under the age of 18 living in them, 71 (48.3%) were opposite-sex married couples living together, 12 (8.2%) had a female householder with no husband present, 10 (6.8%) had a male householder with no wife present.  There were 13 (8.8%) unmarried opposite-sex partnerships, and 0 (0%) same-sex married couples or partnerships. 42 households (28.6%) were one person and 16 (10.9%) had someone living alone who was 65 or older. The average household size was 2.35.  There were 93 families (63.3% of households); the average family size was 2.80.

The age distribution was 64 people (18.5%) under the age of 18, 23 people (6.6%) aged 18 to 24, 54 people (15.6%) aged 25 to 44, 141 people (40.8%) aged 45 to 64, and 64 people (18.5%) who were 65 or older.  The median age was 49.6 years. For every 100 females, there were 104.7 males.  For every 100 females age 18 and over, there were 102.9 males.

There were 166 housing units at an average density of 13.4 per square mile, of the occupied units 119 (81.0%) were owner-occupied and 28 (19.0%) were rented. The homeowner vacancy rate was 3.2%; the rental vacancy rate was 6.7%.  284 people (82.1% of the population) lived in owner-occupied housing units and 62 people (17.9%) lived in rental housing units.

2000
At the 2000 census there were 254 people, 109 households, and 72 families in the CDP.  The population density was 20.6 people per square mile (7.9/km).  There were 130 housing units at an average density of 10.5 per square mile (4.1/km).  The racial makeup of the CDP was 92.91% White, 3.94% Native American, 0.79% Asian, 0.39% from other races, and 1.97% from two or more races. Hispanic or Latino of any race were 2.76%.

Of the 109 households 21.1% had children under the age of 18 living with them, 56.0% were married couples living together, 6.4% had a female householder with no husband present, and 33.9% were non-families. 24.8% of households were one person and 11.0% were one person aged 65 or older.  The average household size was 2.33 and the average family size was 2.71.

The age distribution was 20.9% under the age of 18, 2.0% from 18 to 24, 24.0% from 25 to 44, 39.0% from 45 to 64, and 14.2% 65 or older.  The median age was 47 years. For every 100 females, there were 104.8 males.  For every 100 females age 18 and over, there were 101.0 males.

The median household income was $27,083 and the median family income  was $31,250. Males had a median income of $41,250 versus $33,750 for females. The per capita income for the CDP was $11,943.  About 21.6% of families and 24.3% of the population were below the poverty line, including 22.7% of those under the age of eighteen and 11.8% of those sixty five or over.

Politics

See also
French Gulch Historic District

References

Census-designated places in Shasta County, California
French-American culture in California
Census-designated places in California